Lucky Bay is a bay located at  on the south coast of Western Australia, in the Cape Le Grand National Park. Located south-east of Esperance, the bay is a tourist spot known for its bright white sands and turquoise-coloured waters.

History

Matthew Flinders had sailed into the hazardous Archipelago of the Recherche, and found his ship surrounded by islands and rocks with nightfall coming on. He named this area "Lucky Bay" when his vessel HMS Investigator took refuge after a summer storm. Recounting the adventure, he wrote the following:

Geography
In 2017 it was scientifically tested as having the whitest sand in Australia, possibly the world, knocking Hyams Beach in NSW off its perch. Lucky Bay was ahead of Hellfire Bay and Tallebudgera Creek Beach in Queensland, with Hyams Beach coming at fifth place. The test was conducted by soil science consultant Noel Schoknecht. Samples were amassed from the top 10cm in the "active zone" between the water and the sand dunes. Schoknecht said the whitest sands are usually made up of fine grains of milky or frosted quartz and a lack of adulteration.

Tourism
The beach is known for its pure white sand and clear tranquil waters bay. It is ideal for swimming, snorkelling, fishing, surfing, launching small boats and also for camping and whale watching. Nearby there are solar powered showers and public toilets. Kangaroos may be present in the beach area.

Gallery

See also
Whitehaven Beach, a white sandy beach in Queensland
 Hyams Beach, a beach in New South Wales also with white sand

References

Bays of Western Australia
Sandboarding locations
South coast of Western Australia
Beaches of Western Australia
Tourist attractions in Western Australia